Various ships have had the name Arbuthnot:

  served the British Royal Navy between 1780–1786
 , at least four schooners operating during the American War of Independence
 , a 41-ton steam ship that burnt out Murray River, Australia, in 1913
 , paddle steamer, built in 1923
 , a fast sailing ship, constructed in 1841

Ship names